Dentarene is a genus of sea snails, marine gastropod mollusks in the family Liotiidae.

Description
The special characteristics of this genus are  
 a white shell
 a strongly varicose lip
 the umbilical ridge becomes a twisted appendage of the columellar region of the inner lip
 there is almost no axial sculpture, or it becomes interrupted except between the two peripheral keels.

Distribution
The species of this genus occurs in the tropical Indo-West Pacific.

Species
Species within the genus Dentarene include:
 Dentarene loculosa (Gould, 1859)
 Dentarene munita Iredale, 1929
 Dentarene rosadoi Bozzetti & Ferrario, 2005
 Dentarene sarcina Iredale, 1929
Species brought into synonymy
  Dentarene munitus [sic]: synonym of Dentarene munita Iredale, 1929

References

 
Liotiidae